Pathini Penn is a 1993 Indian Tamil-language drama film directed by R. C. Sakthi. The film stars Rupini and Livingston, with Nizhalgal Ravi and V. Gopalakrishnan portraying supporting roles. The film which was an adaptation of the novel of the same name by G. Thilakavathi, was released in June 1993.

Cast 
Rupini
Janagaraj
Livingston
V. Gopalakrishnan
Nizhalgal Ravi
Chithra

Soundtrack 
Soundtrack was composed by M. S. Viswanathan and Lyrics were written by Pulamaipithan.
"Pandiya Naatu Seemai" – S. P. Balasubrahmanyam, Vani Jairam
"Ulagam Namma Veedu" – Vani Jairam
"Thottil Ondru Illai Endru"-S. P. Balasubrahmanyam
"Ennamma Varutham"-S. P. Balasubrahmanyam

Awards 
The film won Tamil Nadu State Film Award for Best Film, R. C. Sakthi won Tamil Nadu State Film Award for Best Dialogue Writer. Rupini won Tamil Nadu State Film Award Special Prize for Best Actress while Pulamaipithan won Tamil Nadu State Film Award for Best Lyricist.

Reception 
Pathini Penn was released on 25 June 1993. Malini Mannath of The Indian Express appreciated the film citing "Sakti's sensitive handling of the subject, his carefully etched scenes, his pithy hard-hitting dialogues, and his getting the best out of his artistes makes this film engrossing".

References

External links 

1990s Tamil-language films
1993 films
Films about women in India
Films based on Indian novels
Films scored by M. S. Viswanathan
Indian drama films